The women's 400 metres hurdles at the 2009 World Championships in Athletics was held at the Olympic Stadium on 17, 18 and 20 August.

In the four major championships between 2004 and 2008, the twelve available medals were won by eleven different athletes. Yuliya Pechonkina was the only athlete to reach the podium twice in that period, having won the 2005 World Championships and won the silver at the same event two years later. With such a quick turnover, it was expected that new athletes would again be possible medallists, especially as Pechonkina and reigning champion Jana Pittman-Rawlinson had withdrawn prior to the competition. However, 2005 medallist Lashinda Demus appeared to be a likely contender, having set the world-leading time of 52.63 seconds a month before the competition (significantly faster than any other athlete at that point in the season). Angela Moroşanu, Josanne Lucas were amongst the season's fastest hurdlers, but the gold and silver medallists from the Beijing Olympics, Melaine Walker and Sheena Tosta had not shown strong form.

Demus and Moroşanu recorded the fastest times on the first day of the competition, which saw no surprise eliminations. Kaliese Spencer was the third fastest, making her seem a possible finalist. Reigning Olympic champion Walker was the fastest in the semi-finals, with Lucas the second fastest in a national record time. Spencer, winner of the second race, was initially disqualified but was reinstated upon review. Amaka Ogoegbunam, a Nigerian athlete, tested positive for metenolone (an anabolic steroid) after the semi-finals, becoming the second athlete of the competition to fail a drugs test after Jamel Chatbi.

In the final race, Demus and Walker started fastest, with Lucas and Spencer not far behind. Demus took the lead near the final stretch but took the last two hurdles badly, allowing Walker to pass her to take the gold medal. Walker's time of 52.42 s was a Championship record and North American record, and only 0.08 seconds away from Pechonkina's world record. Bronze medallist Lucas had improved her national record by a significant amount (0.78 seconds) and fourth placed Spencer had set a new personal best.

Walker had won despite modest performances in the season prior to the competition, while Demus failed to match her world-leading time she had set at the Herculis meeting in Monaco. Walker's run, which capped an Olympic and World double, was the second fastest in the history of the event. Josanne Lucas had significantly improved over the course of a year, knocking two seconds off her personal best, demonstrating her potential as a future medallist.

Medalists

Records before the Championships

Qualification standards

Schedule

Results

Heats
Qualification: First 4 in each heat(Q) and the next 4 fastest(q) advance to the semifinals.

Semifinals
Qualification: First 2 in each semifinal (Q) and the next 2 fastest(q) advance to the final.

Final

References
General
400 metres hurdles results. IAAF. Retrieved on 2009-08-24.
Specific

400 metres hurdles
400 metres hurdles at the World Athletics Championships
2009 in women's athletics